In convex geometry and polyhedral combinatorics, the extension complexity of a convex polytope  is the smallest number of facets among convex polytopes  that have  as a projection.

If a polytope describing the feasible solutions to a combinatorial optimization problem has low extension complexity, this could potentially be used to devise efficient algorithms for the problem, using linear programming on its extended formulation. For this reason, researchers have studied the extension complexity of the polytopes arising in this way. For instance, it is known that the matching polytope has exponential extension complexity. On the other hand, the independence polytope of regular matroids has polynomial extension complexity.

The notion of extension complexity has also been generalized from linear programming to semidefinite programming, by considering projections of spectrahedra in place of projections of polytopes.

References

Polyhedral combinatorics